Tetreuaresta ellipa is a species of tephritid or fruit flies in the genus Tetreuaresta of the family Tephritidae.

Distribution
Peru, Bolivia.

References

Tephritinae
Insects described in 1942
Diptera of South America